The MegaRAC  from American Megatrends is a product line of Service Processors providing complete Out-of-band, or Lights-out remote management of computer systems independently of the Operating System status or location to troubleshoot computers and assure continuity of service.  MegaRAC Service Processors come in various formats - PCI cards, embedded modules and software-only.

History
The MegaRAC remote management controller was introduced in 1998 for Dell, that later developed the DRAC. The second generation card, MegaRACG2 (2002), provided console, KVM graphical redirection, firewall, and battery backup.

MegaRAC SP Firmware
The MegaRAC SP firmware is composed of four major functionality groups:
 Complete IPMI 2.0 implementation, providing sensor and health monitoring, alerting, event logging Serial over LAN, et cetera. This firmware utilizes Linux 2.6.
 Virtual KVM for redirection of Video, Keyboard and Mouse signals. This uses AMI's proprietary compression technology.
 Virtual Media for redirection of CD/DVD. This is used to utilize a local CD/DVD to install an Operating system or software on a remote host.
 DMTF compliant management infrastructure, implementing CIM, SMASH and WS-MAN.
The MegaRAC SP firmware is marketed to Original Equipment Manufacturers (OEMs), not end-users.

References 

Out-of-band management